Mianyang Nanjiao Airport  is an airport serving the city of Mianyang in Sichuan Province, China.  It is located in the southern suburbs of Mianyang (Nanjiao means "southern suburbs" in Chinese), 10 kilometers from the city center.

Opened on 28 April 2001, Mianyang Nanjiao is the second largest airport in Sichuan after Chengdu Shuangliu International Airport.  The airport is also used for pilot training by the Civil Aviation Flight University of China (Mianyang Flight College).

In 2011 Mianyang Nanjiao Airport served 622,816 passengers, ranking 66th among China's airports.  It also handled 4,491.5 tons of cargo and 207,140 aircraft movements.

Facilities
Mianyang Nanjiao Airport has a 2,400-meter runway (class 4D) capable of handling major aircraft including the Boeing 737.  It also has a 26,000 square-meter terminal building and 11 aircraft parking aprons.  The airport is designed with an annual handling capacity of 2 million passengers.

Airlines and destinations

Mianyang Nanjiao Airport is served by the following airlines:

See also
List of airports in China
List of the busiest airports in China

References

Airports in Sichuan
Airports established in 2001
2001 establishments in China